Bartłomiej Radosław Pawłowski (born 13 November 1992) is a Polish professional footballer who plays as a forward or left winger for Widzew Łódź.

Career

Club
Pawłowski began his career in the youth ranks of ŁKS Łódź and Promień Opalenica. In June 2010, he joined Jagiellonia Białystok on a three-year contract. In July 2011, he was loaned to GKS Katowice on a one-year deal.

On 19 June 2017, he signed a contract with Zagłębie Lubin.

On 3 August 2019, Pawłowski signed a three-year contract with Turkish Süper Lig club Gazişehir Gaziantep. However, he was mostly used as a substitute there.

On 10 September 2020, he joined Polish Ekstraklasa side Śląsk Wrocław on a 3-year contract. By the decision of the training staff, Bartłomiej Pawłowski was moved to the Śląsk Wrocław's reserves on 13 January 2022.

International
He was part of the Poland U19 and U21 national teams.

References

External links
 
 

1992 births
Living people
People from Zgierz
Polish footballers
Polish expatriate footballers
Association football forwards
Ekstraklasa players
I liga players
II liga players
La Liga players
Jagiellonia Białystok players
GKS Katowice players
Jarota Jarocin players
Warta Poznań players
Widzew Łódź players
Málaga CF players
Lechia Gdańsk players
Zawisza Bydgoszcz players
Korona Kielce players
Zagłębie Lubin players
Śląsk Wrocław players
Expatriate footballers in Spain
Polish expatriate sportspeople in Spain
Expatriate footballers in Turkey
Polish expatriate sportspeople in Turkey
Sportspeople from Łódź Voivodeship
Poland youth international footballers
Poland under-21 international footballers
Gaziantep F.K. footballers